Luigi Panarelli (born 26 April 1976) is an Italian football coach and a former player who played as a defender.

Playing career

Early career
Panarelli started his career at hometown club Taranto. He won Serie D Champion in 1995. He played another season at Serie C2 before joined Serie A side S.S.C. Napoli, which he failed to play regularly. He followed Napoli relegated to Serie B in 1998, but just played 3 times before joined league rival Andria. In summer 1999, he joined Serie A side Torino and followed the team relegated in 2000 but just played 5 time in 2 seasons. In summer 2001, he left on loan to Serie B side Crotone as he was the surplus of Torino for the Serie A campaign.

Roma and loans
In summer 2002, he was signed by A.S. Roma in co-ownership deal. That season Torino signed Alberto Maria Fontana (tagged for €5.5M), Giammarco Frezza (tagged for €5M) Daniele Martinetti (tagged for €1.6M) in co-ownership deal and Roma signed Panarelli in co-ownership deal for €5M, Gabriele Paoletti for €5.5M, Alberto Schettino for €1.6M, which made there were no cash involved but generate €12.1M transfer income to both parties and €12.1M cost to amortize in instalments, generate "profit" in the first season.
Panarelli was signed a 3-year contract, which he was rumoured to play for Palermo, also owned by Roma President Franco Sensi. But after Palermo was sold 1 month later, he was loaned to Serie C2 side Florentia Viola, the new club to replace the bankrupted A.C. Fiorentina, but failed to play regularly. In the next season, he left for hometown club Taranto and played 24 matches at Serie C1. In June 2004, Torino signed remained rights of Frezza, Fontana and Martinetti for free and Roma signed Paoletti for fee and Panarelli Schettino for just €60,000 in total. Panarelli then left for Teramo on loan.

Avellino
In August 2005, Panarelli signed a contract with Avellino. He was not a regular of the team, and in March 2006 appeared in the reality TV show without asking the permission of the club.

Lega Pro
He then released by Avellino and in November 2006 signed a contract with Salernitana. But on 31 January 2007 he joined U.S. Foggia. In August 2007, he signed an annual contract with Cavese. In 2008–09 season, he played regularly for Prima Divisione side Sorrento. In August 2009, he was signed by Seconda Divisione side Brindisi where he played 17 out of first 18 matches. In January 2010, he returned to Taranto.

Coaching career
After retirement, Panarelli became a coach, making his managerial debut in charge of Altamura in 2016. He successively took over at Serie D club Taranto in two different stints (from August 2018 to May 2019, and successively from October 2019 to May 2020).
He then served as head coach of Fidelis Andria for the 2020–21 Serie D season, which saw his club ending in third place and then being readmitted to Serie C to fill a vacancy. Being confirmed in charge of Fidelis Andria for the new season, he was dismissed on 11 October 2021 due to poor results.

He then briefly served as head coach of Serie D club Casertana from 1 November to 28 December 2022.

Honours
Serie B: 2001
Serie D: 1995

References

External links
 Profile at AIC.Football.it 
 
 

1976 births
Living people
Sportspeople from Taranto
Italian footballers
Serie A players
Serie B players
Serie C players
Serie D players
Taranto F.C. 1927 players
S.S.C. Napoli players
S.S. Fidelis Andria 1928 players
Torino F.C. players
F.C. Crotone players
ACF Fiorentina players
S.S. Teramo Calcio players
U.S. Avellino 1912 players
U.S. Salernitana 1919 players
Calcio Foggia 1920 players
Association football defenders
Italian football managers
Taranto F.C. 1927 managers
S.S. Fidelis Andria 1928 managers